Koh Doot is a large village in Ye Township in Mawlamyine District in the Mon State of south-east Myanmar. The Koh Doot Ferry is about 1.7 km north-west of the village on the Koh Doot Chaung.

Notes

External links
 Koh Doot at "Kawdut Map — Satellite Images of Kawdut" Maplandia World Gazetteer

Populated places in Mon State